St. Patrick's GAC is a Gaelic Athletic Association club based in The Loup in County Londonderry, Northern Ireland. It is a member of the Derry GAA.

The club's biggest success was winning the 2003 Ulster Senior Club Football Championship. They have also won the Derry Senior Football Championship three times.

2019 Championship Football

2018 Championship Football

2017 Championship Football

2016 Championship Football

Hurling 
After being suspended from football for two years, a hurling club, St Finbarr's, was started, winning back-to-back Derry Senior Hurling Championships in the 1960s, before being disbanded.

History 
St Patrick's Loup was formed in 1933 and won its first Derry Senior Championship three years later. Players on the team included Paddy Larkin, Fr Éamonn Devlin (who played for Armagh) and Peter Donaghy (played as goalkeeper for Derry). After disappearing from the top, they were a Junior side for many years, reaching the 1958/59? Derry Junior Football Championship final, where they lost to Glen.

In 1963 and 1964 St Finbarrs won the Derry Hurling Championship.

The current pitch was opened by Cardinal Tomás Ó Fiaich in 1981.

Football titles

Senior
Ulster Senior Club Football Championships: 1
2003
Derry Senior Football Championships: 3
1936, 2003, 2009
Derry Senior Football Leagues: 1
2002
Derry Intermediate Football Championships: 1
1994
Derry Intermediate Football Leagues: 1
1994
Derry Junior Football Championships: 3
 1949, 1984, 1989
Derry Junior Football Leagues: 3
1977, 1984, 1989

Minor
Ulster Minor Club Football Championships: 2
1993, 1995
Derry Minor Football Championships: 2
1993, 1995
Derry Minor Football Leagues: 5
1992, 1995, 2003, 2004, 2010
South Derry Minor Football Championships: 1*
2001
South Derry Minor Football Leagues: 1*
2001

U-16
Derry U-16 Football Championships: 2*
1991, 1993
South Derry U-16 Football Championships: 2*
1991, 1993
South Derry U-16 Football Leagues: 1*
1991

U-15
Ulster Óg Sports: 1
1992
Derry Óg Sports: 2
1990, 1992

U-14
Derry Féile na nÓgs: 1
1989
Derry U-14 Football Championships: 1*
1989
South Derry U-14 Football Championships: 1*
1989
South Derry U-14 Football Leagues: 1*
1989

U-12
South Derry 'A' U-12 Football Leagues: 1*
1987
South Derry 'B' U-12 Football Leagues: 1*
2004

Hurling titles

Senior

Derry Senior Hurling Championships: 2
1963, 1964
(Won as St Finbarr's - a parish amalgamation.)

* Note: Some honours, particularly those marked with * may be incomplete lists. Please help complete the list by adding in any honours you know of.

Well-known footballers
Johnny McBride - First ever Loup player to captain the  Derry Senior footballers.
Paul McFlynn - Former Derry player.
Diarmuid Ó Doibhilin - Former Derry player and former Derry County Board Chairman. Captained Derry Minors and St Patrick's Armagh MacRory Cup team in 1958/59?. Won a  Derry Championship and League with Ballymaguigan in 1962.

See also
Derry Senior Football Championship
Derry Senior Hurling Championship
List of Gaelic games clubs in Derry

External links
Official Loup GAA Website

Gaelic games clubs in County Londonderry
Gaelic football clubs in County Londonderry